Francesco Posocco (born 13 September 1995) is an Italian football player.

Club career
He made his Serie C debut for SPAL on 26 September 2015 in a game against Pontedera.

On 28 October 2019 he joined Serie D club Clodiense, and on 13 December he was released from his contract.

References

External links
 

1995 births
People from Vittorio Veneto
Living people
Italian footballers
Association football midfielders
A.C. Belluno 1905 players
S.P.A.L. players
Santarcangelo Calcio players
U.S. Città di Pontedera players
U.S. Catanzaro 1929 players
Serie D players
Serie C players
Footballers from Veneto
Sportspeople from the Province of Treviso